Danielithosia aureolata is a moth of the family Erebidae. It is found in China (Fujian, Sichuan, Zhejiang).

References

Moths described in 1954
Lithosiina